This list includes productions done under DC Entertainment, a subsidiary of Warner Bros. Discovery.

Film 

All the films are distributed by Warner Bros. Pictures, except as indicated.

Live-action

Animated 
All the films are made for Direct-to-video/television and produced by Warner Bros. Animation, except as indicated.

Short films 
All short films are direct-to-video are produced by Warner Bros. Animation, except as indicated.

Television 
All short films are direct-to-video are (co-)produced by Warner Bros. Television Studios, except as indicated.

Live-action

Animated

Short series

See also 
 DC Extended Universe
 List of unproduced DC Comics projects
 List of unproduced films based on DC Comics imprints
 List of video games based on DC Comics

Notes

References

External links 
 

 
DC Comics-related lists